The men's high jump event  at the 1995 IAAF World Indoor Championships was held on 11–12 March.

Medalists

Results

Qualification
Qualification: 2.26 (Q) or at least 12 best performers (q) qualified for the final.

Final

References

High
High jump at the World Athletics Indoor Championships